At least two ships of the French Navy have been named Glorieux:

  a ship of the line launched in 1756 and captured by the Royal Navy in 1782
 French ship Glorieux a  renamed  before launch

French Navy ship names